Evelyn Werner is a German Paralympic skier. She represented Germany in para-alpine skiing at the 1980 Paralympic Winter Games. She won a bronze medal.

Career 
At the 1980 Winter Paralympic Games, Werner won bronze in the 3B slalom with a time of 1: 45.87; (in 1st place Sabine Barisch who finished the race in 1: 38.23 and in 2nd place Brigitte Madlener in 1: 40.68).

Also at the 1980 Winter Paralympic Games, Werner finished fourth in the giant slalom category 3B, time achieved 3: 22.55; on the podium Brigitte Madlener (gold in 2: 52.86), Sabine Barisch (silver in 3: 13.47) and Sabine Stiefbold (bronze in 3: 15.88).

References 

Paralympic bronze medalists for Germany